Salinibacillus aidingensis is a Gram-positive, moderately halophilic and heterotrophic bacterium from the genus of Salinibacillus which has been isolated from a lake from Xinjiang in China.

References

External links
Type strain of Salinibacillus aidingensis at BacDive -  the Bacterial Diversity Metadatabase

 

Bacillaceae
Bacteria described in 2005